The 122d Fighter Squadron is a unit of the Louisiana Air National Guard 159th Fighter Wing located at Naval Air Station Joint Reserve Base New Orleans, Louisiana. The 122d is equipped with the F-15C/D Eagle.

The squadron is a descendant organization of the 122d Observation Squadron, established on 30 July 1940. It is one of the 29 original National Guard Observation Squadrons of the United States Army National Guard formed before World War II.

History
The 122nd Observation Squadron, was formed in December 1940 at the New Orleans Municipal Airport, (currently known as Lakefront Airport). Two months later, with an assortment of 0-38s, O-46s, 0-47s, O-49s and BC-1As to fly, the unit was called to active service at Esler Field in Alexandria, LA, in response to a general military call-up following the bombing of Pearl Harbor.

World War II
With the United States' entry into World War II, the 122nd returned to New Orleans in December 1941 to conduct anti-submarine patrol over the Gulf of Mexico. Four missions were flown each day, the aircraft flying in pairs, as far as 100 miles out into the Gulf.

In February 1942, the Squadron was re-equipped with A-20 Havoc Attack Bombers and was deployed first to England as part of Eighth Air Force, then to North Africa as part of Operation Torch invasion forces in November 1943, assigned to Twelfth Air Force.  The 122nd first landed at Fedala, French Morocco and participated in the capture of Casablanca. There, the squadron became part of the 68th Reconnaissance Group.

Several months later the A-20s were replaced by P-38 Lightnings, P-39 Airacobras and P-40 Warhawks, and the unit was reorganized as a branch of the North African Fighter Training Command. In the summer of 1943, the unit was moved to Bertaux, Algeria, where members trained French and American pilots in navigation and general fighting tactics.

The 122nd was reassigned to HQ Fifteenth Air Force in May 1944 and was re-designated as the 885th Bombardment Squadron (heavy). Equipped with highly modified B-17 Flying Fortresses and B-24 Liberators, the unit transported supplies to partisans and engaged in nighttime special operations missions, flying into Occupied France, Fascist Italy, Yugoslavia and other parts of Occupied Europe supporting partisans and parachuting Allied Agents into enemy territory.    Was inactivated in Italy in October 1945.

Louisiana Air National Guard

The wartime 885th Bombardment Squadron was re-designated as the 122nd Bombardment Squadron and was allotted to the Louisiana Air National Guard on 24 May 1946. It was organized at New Orleans Lakefront Airport, Louisiana and was extended federal recognition on 5 December 1946 by the National Guard Bureau. The 122nd Bombardment Squadron was bestowed the history, honors, and colors of the 885th Bombardment Squadron and all predecessor units.

The squadron was equipped with B-26 Invader light bombers and was allocated to the Tenth Air Force, Continental Air Command.  The squadron was equipped with 25 aircraft, mostly Douglas B-26C Invaders, but a few "B" models as well, most of the aircraft assigned were newly manufactured at the Douglas plant in Tulsa, Oklahoma at the end of World War II and were never assigned to any wartime units.

During the postwar years, the Air National Guard was almost like a flying country club and a pilot could often show up at the field, check out an aircraft and go flying. However, these units also had regular military exercises that kept up proficiency and in gunnery and bombing contests they would often score better than full-time USAF units.  The pilots practiced formation bombing with the B-26s as well as low-level intrusion and strafing. Parts were no problem and many of the maintenance personnel were World War II veterans so readiness was quite high and the planes were often much better maintained than their USAF counterparts.

Korean War Federalization
With the surprise invasion of South Korea on 25 June 1950, and the regular military's complete lack of readiness, the ANG was mobilized into federal active duty.   The 122nd Bombardment Squadron was federalized and ordered to active duty on 1 April 1951.  By then most of the squadron's aircraft and many of its pilots had already been transferred to active-duty units and sent to Japan as replacement and reinforcing aircraft for B-26 units engaged in combat.

The squadron was transferred to Langley Air Force Base, Virginia as part of Ninth Air Force, Tactical Air Command.  The 122d became part of the 4400th Combat Crew Training Group, a temporary organization formed by TAC with the mission of training pilots in the B-26 for subsequent deployment to the war zone.   The 122d was joined by the PA ANG 117th Bombardment Squadron.    On 1 November 1952 the training unit at Langley was inactivated and returned to Louisiana State Control on 1 January 1953.

Tactical Bomber mission
Following the end of the Korean War, the B-26s began to be withdrawn from active service and replaced by jet-powered equipment such as the Martin B-57 Canberra and the Douglas B-66 Destroyer. The 122nd was re-equipped with former active-duty B-26s and continued training with the versatile light bomber under the Texas ANG 136th Fighter-Bomber Wing, being operationally gained by Tactical Air Command.

Air Defense mission

In 1957, the 136th Fighter-Bomber Wing was transferred from TAC to Air Defense Command, being re-designated as an Air Defense Wing.  The B-26s were sent to storage at Davis-Monthan AFB, Arizona (many would be later used in the Vietnam War as counter-insurgency aircraft), and the 122nd was re-designated as a Fighter-Interceptor Squadron on 1 June 1957.   With the transfer to ADC, the 122nd was initially equipped with some obsolete F-80C-11 (modified F-80A to F-80C standards) Shooting Stars as an interim aircraft, receiving F-86D Sabre Interceptors in late 1957 and lastly the upgraded F-86L Sabre Interceptor at the end of the year with uprated afterburning engines and new electronics.

With the F-86L, the squadron was selected by Air Defense Command to man a runway alert program on full 24-hour basis – with armed jet fighters ready to "scramble" at a moment's notice. This event brought the squadron into the daily combat operational program of the USAF, placing it on "the end of the runway" alongside regular USAF-Air Defense Fighter Squadrons.

In 1958, the 122nd was authorized to expand to a group level, and the 159th Fighter Interceptor Group was established by the National Guard Bureau on 1 April 1958. The 122nd FIS becoming the group's flying squadron. Other support squadrons assigned into the group were the 159th Headquarters, 159th Material Squadron (Maintenance), 159th Combat Support Squadron, and the 159th USAF Dispensary.

In July 1960, the 159th converted to the F-102 Delta Daggers. In 1962, the 122nd Fighter-Interceptor Squadron was assigned to the Gulfport Combat Readiness Training Center, Mississippi, for six weeks of intensive flying training. Involved were 150 officers and airmen, including support elements from the 159th Consolidated Aircraft Maintenance Squadron, 159th Material Squadron and 159th Air Base Squadron.

Tactical Air Command

In December 1970 the 159th was transferred from Aerospace Defense Command to Tactical Air Command.  ADC was phasing down its manned interceptor force as the chances of a Soviet Bomber attack on the United States seemed remote.   The unit was re-designated the 159th Tactical Fighter Group, and the 122nd Tactical Fighter Squadron was re-equipped with F-100D/F Super Sabres.   In 1970, the F-100 was still considered a first-line aircraft, and most of the F-100s in the inventory were serving in South Vietnam flying combat missions.  The Super Sabres received by the 122d came from the USAFE 20th Tactical Fighter Wing which was transitioning to the General Dynamics F-111F.    With the conversion to the F-100s, the ADC 24-hour alert status ended and retraining in tactical fighter missions began.

The 159th flew the F-100s for almost a decade, retiring the aircraft beginning in April 1979 when the 122nd began receiving F-4C Phantom II aircraft from active-duty units.   In 1979 Aerospace Defense Command was inactivated, with Tactical Air Command taking over the Continental US Air Defense Mission. The 159th was assigned to Air Defense, Tactical Air Command (ADTAC), a named unit at the Numbered Air Force level under TAC.  Under ADTAC, the 122nd began to fly Air Defense missions again with the F-4C, although the squadron was dual-hatted and continued to fly Tactical Fighter training missions with the Phantom.

The Phantoms were ending their service life in the mid-1980s, and in 1986, the F-4Cs were replaced by F-15A/B Eagles.   As the F-15s had no tactical bombing capability at the time, the 122d continued the Air Defense mission under TAC.

Modern era
In March 1992 the 159th Tactical Fighter Group became the 159th Fighter Group when the unit adopted the USAF Objective Organization, and the 122nd Fighter Squadron was assigned to the new 159th Operations Group.   Later in June, Tactical Air Command stood down and was replaced by Air Combat Command (ACC).   No change in mission was made and the 159th continued in the air defense role.

In the early 1990s, squadron aircraft and personnel were deployed to Aviano Air Base, Italy, flying combat missions over the former Yugoslavia during the Kosovo War as part of Operation Allied Force.  On 11 October 1995, in accordance with the "one base-one wing" policy, the 159th Fighter Group was changed in status and was re-designated as the 159th Fighter Wing.
In mid-1996, the Air Force, in response to budget cuts, and changing world situations, began experimenting with Air Expeditionary organizations. The Air Expeditionary Force (AEF) concept was developed that would mix Active-Duty, Reserve and Air National Guard elements into a combined force. Instead of entire permanent units deploying as "Provisional" as in the 1991 Gulf War, Expeditionary units are composed of "aviation packages" from several wings, including active-duty Air Force, the Air Force Reserve Command and the Air National Guard, would be married together to carry out the assigned deployment rotation.

In the late 1990s, the 122nd Expeditionary Fighter Squadron was activated on several occasions, sending packages of personnel and aircraft to Incirlik Air Base, Turkey, to fly Combat Air Patrol missions over Iraq as part of Operation Northern Watch.  Also the 122nd EFS was activated with a deployment to Prince Sultan Air Base, Saudi Arabia, flying CAP missions over Southern Iraq as part of Operation Southern Watch.

In response to the 9/11 attacks in 2001, the 122nd Fighter Squadron engaged in Combat Air Patrols over major United States Cities as part of Operation Noble Eagle (ONE). ONE patrols continued into 2002 before being scaled down.

In 2006, the F-15A models were retired and the 122nd was upgraded to the more capable F-15C Eagle.  As part of the Global War on Terrorism, the 122nd EFS has been deployed to support Operation Iraqi Freedom (OIF); Operation Enduring Freedom (OEF) in Afghanistan, Operation New Horizons in Central and South America and Operation New Dawn in Afghanistan.

The most recent deployment of the 122nd Expeditionary Fighter Squadron was completed in October 2012 when the squadron deployed to at Al Dhafra Air Base, United Arab Emirates, and as part of the 380th Expeditionary Operations Group, the 122nd EFS flew missions in support of the Joint Air Defense of the Persian Gulf and Operation Enduring Freedom. The mission included providing air superiority in support of national military objectives and flying Fighter Integration Sorties with F-22 Raptors and F-15E Strike Eagles.

Lineage
 Designated as the 122d Observation Squadron, and allotted to the National Guard on 30 July 1940
 Activated on 2 March 1941
 Ordered to active service on 1 October 1941
 Redesignated 122d Observation Squadron (Light) on 13 January 1942
 Redesignated 122d Observation Squadron (Medium) on 12 March 1942
 Redesignated 122d Observation Squadron on 4 July 1942
 Redesignated 122d Liaison Squadron on 31 May 1943
 Redesignated 885th Bombardment Squadron, Heavy on 12 May 1944
 Inactivated on 4 October 1945
 Redesignated 122d Bombardment Squadron, Light and allotted to the National Guard on 24 May 1946
 Organized on 2 November 1946
 Extended federal recognition on 5 December 1946
 Federalized and ordered to active service on 1 April 1951
 Inactivated and returned to Louisiana state control on 1 January 1953
 Activated on 1 January 1953
 Redesignated 122d Bombardment Squadron, Tactical in 1955
 Redesignated 122d Fighter-Interceptor Squadron on 1 June 1957
 Redesignated 122d Tactical Fighter Squadron on 5 December 1970
 Redesignated 122d Fighter Squadron on 15 March 1992

Assignments
 Louisiana National Guard, 2 March 1941
 68th Observation Group (later 68th Reconnaissance Group, 68th Tactical Reconnaissance Group), 1 October 1941
 Fifteenth Air Force, 15 June 1944 (attached to Mediterranean Allied Air Forces)
 15th Special Group (later 2641st Special Group), 20 January–20 May 1945
 Army Air Forces Service Command, Mediterranean Theater of Operations, 1945–4 Oct 1945
 Louisiana National Guard, 2 November 1946
 136th Fighter Group, 5 December 1946
 111th Bombardment Group, 1 December 1948
 Louisiana Air National Guard, 1 November 1950
 111th Bombardment Group, 1 February 1951
 4400th Combat Crew Training Group, 13 April 1951 – 1 January 1953
 131st Bombardment Group, 1 January 1953
 159th Fighter Group (later 159th Tactical Fighter Group, 159th Fighter Group), 15 June 1957
 159th Operations Group, 11 October 1995 – present

Stations

 New Orleans Airport, Louisiana, 2 March 1941
 Esler Field, Louisiana, 6 October 1941
 New Orleans Army Airbase, Louisiana, 13 December 1941
 Daniel Field, Georgia, 8 February 1942
 Lawson Field, Georgia, 16 April 1942
 Daniel Field, Georgia, 14 June 1942
 Winston-Salem Airport, North Carolina, 7 July 1942
 Morris Field, North Carolina, 16 August 1942
 Detachment at Fort Dix Army Airfield, New Jersey, 26 September 1942
 Langley Field, Virginia, 3–23 Oct 1942
 Detachment at RAF Wattisham (AAF-377), England, 5–21 Oct 1942
 Fedala Airfield, French Morocco, 9 November 1942
 Casablanca-Anfa Airport, French Morocco, 12 November 1942

 Oujda Airfield, French Morocco, 10 December 1942
 Berguent Airfield, French Morocco, 24 March 1943
 Berteaux Airfield, Algeria, 5 September 1943
 Manduria Airfield, Italy, 25 December 1943
 Blida Airport, Algeria, 12 April 1944
 Maison Blanche Airport, Algeria, 25 Aug-2 Oct 1944
 Brindisi Airport, Italy, 31 October 1944
 Rosignano Airfield, Italy, 20 March 1945
 Pomigliano Airfield, Italy, 20 May-4 Oct 1945
 New Orleans Lakefront Airport, Louisiana, 5 December 1946 – Dec 1957
 Operated from: Langley AFB, Virginia, 13 April 1951 – 1 January 1953
 NAS New Orleans (later NAS-JRB), Louisiana, Dec 1957–present

Aircraft

 Douglas O-38, 1941–1942
 Douglas O-46, 1941–1942
 North American O-47, 1941–1942
 O-49 Vigilant, 1941–1942
 A-20 Havoc, 1942
 P-38 Lightning, 1943
 P-39 Airacobra, 1943
 P-40 Warhawk, 1943
 B-17 Flying Fortress, 1943–1945
 B-24 Liberator, 1944–1945

 B-26B/C Invader, 1946–1957
 F-80C Shooting Star, 1957
 F-86D Sabre Interceptor, 1957
 F-86L Sabre Interceptor, 1957–1960
 TF/F-102A Delta Dagger, 1960–1970
 F-100D/F Super Sabre, 1970–1979
 F-4C Phantom II, 1979–1985
 F-15A/B Eagle, 1985–2006
 Lockheed WC-130H, 1989 – present
 F-15C/D Eagle, 2006–present

See also

 List of observation squadrons of the United States Army National Guard

References

Notes

Bibliography

External links
 122d Fighter Squadron history
 159th Fighter Wing history
 2641st Special Group (Provisional)
 Rogers, B. (2006). United States Air Force Unit Designations Since 1978. 
  Cornett, Lloyd H. and Johnson, Mildred W., A Handbook of Aerospace Defense Organization  1946–1980, Office of History, Aerospace Defense Center, Peterson AFB, CO (1980).

Squadrons of the United States Air National Guard
Fighter squadrons of the United States Air Force
Military units and formations in Louisiana